Estigmene trivitta is a moth of the family Erebidae. It was described by Francis Walker in 1855. It is found in Angola, the Democratic Republic of the Congo, Kenya, Malawi, South Africa, Tanzania and Zambia.

References

 

Spilosomina
Moths described in 1855
Lepidoptera of Malawi
Lepidoptera of Tanzania
Lepidoptera of Zambia
Moths of Sub-Saharan Africa